The 2019–20 ECHL season was the 32nd season of the ECHL. The regular season began in October 2019 to and was set to conclude in April 2020 with the Kelly Cup playoffs to follow. Twenty-six teams in 19 states and two Canadian provinces were each scheduled for 72 games.

On March 12, 2020, the league announced that the season has been suspended due to the COVID-19 pandemic. On March 14, the league cancelled the remainder of the season.

League business

Team changes 
The Manchester Monarchs ceased operations after four seasons in the league following the 2015 AHL/ECHL franchise swap that was part of the creation of the AHL's Pacific Division. The Monarchs' owners had put the team up for sale during their final season, but failed to find new owners and the franchise was terminated by the league.

Affiliation changes

Annual Board of Governors meeting
The annual ECHL Board of Governors meeting was held at the New York-New York Hotel and Casino in Las Vegas from June 17 to 21, 2019. The Board approved of a rule change extending overtime from five minutes to seven minutes in the same three-on-three sudden death format used since the 2015–16 season.  In addition, the Board approved a rule change for the 2020 Kelly Cup Playoffs regarding players on NHL or AHL contracts.  Should such player have played 260 or more regular season games, they must have played a minimum of five games in the AHL that season in order to be eligible for the ECHL Kelly Cup Playoffs.  The rule does not apply for players on ECHL contracts.

All-star game
The 2020 ECHL All-Star Game was held on January 22, 2020, at the Intrust Bank Arena in Wichita, Kansas. The All-Star Classic retained the four team, 3-on-3 player tournament style used the previous season, including two teams made from the Wichita Thunder (named Team Bolts and Team Hammers) and one team for each conference's All-Star players. In addition to the ECHL All-Star players, each team also had a player from the Professional Women's Hockey Players Association with Dani Cameranesi, Kali Flanagan, Gigi Marvin, and Annie Pankowski taking part in the festivities.

In the round-robin, the Team Bolts went 2–0–1, Team Hammers went 1–1–1, and both conferences went 1–2–0. The skills competition took place in between rounds of the tournament. The Tulsa Oilers' J.J. Piccinich won the fastest skater event, the Idaho Steelheads' Brady Norrish won the hardest shot event, and the Atlanta Gladiators' Tommy Marchin won the accuracy shooting event. The results of the skills competition re-seeded the teams for the semifinal round where the Eastern Conference tied Team Bolts 4–4 and the Western Conference defeated the Team Hammers 4–1. The Eastern Conference All-Star team then defeated the Western Conference 4–2. The Florida Everblades' Logan Roe was named the tournament's Most Valuable Player.

Standings

Final standings
Eastern Conference

Western Conference

 - clinched playoff spot,  - clinched regular season division title,  - Brabham Cup (regular season) champion

Postseason

At the end of the regular season, the top four teams in each division would have qualified for the 2020 Kelly Cup playoffs and be seeded one through four based on highest point total earned in the season. However, as the season was cancelled due to the coronavirus pandemic, the playoffs were not held. At the time of the cancellation, six teams had already clinched playoff berths: the Allen Americans, Cincinnati Cyclones, Florida Everblades, Newfoundland Growlers, Reading Royals, and South Carolina Stingrays.

Awards

Due to the season being cancelled, only individual regular season awards were given as the team-based awards were incomplete.

All-ECHL teams
First Team
Tomas Sholl (G) – Idaho Steelheads
Alex Breton (D) – Allen Americans
Logan Roe (D) – Florida Everblades
Josh Kestner (F) – Toledo Walleye
Tyler Sheehy (F) – Allen Americans
David Vallorini (F) – Brampton Beast

Second Team
Parker Milner (G) – South Carolina Stingrays
Eric Knodel (D) – Reading Royals
Miles Liberati (D) – Tulsa Oilers
Brady Ferguson (F) – Newfoundland Growlers
Tim McGauley (F) – Utah Grizzlies
Jesse Schultz (F) – Cincinnati Cylones

Rookie Team
Billy Christopoulos (G) – Toledo Walleye
Justin Baudry (D) – Cincinnati Cyclones
Joseph Duszak (D) – Newfoundland Growlers
Samuel Asselin (F) – Atlanta Gladiators
Justin Brazeau (F) – Newfoundland Growlers
Tyler Sheehy (F) – Allen Americans

See also 
2019 in sports
2020 in sports

References

External links
ECHL website

 
2019-20
3
3
Ice hockey events curtailed due to the COVID-19 pandemic